Prolepsis is the second album by the North Carolina band Arrogance, released in 1975 (see 1975 in music).

Track listing
Side One
"Six Wings" (Kirkland) – 3:20
"Bad Girl" (Dixon) – 2:42
"Barely Alive" (Kirkland) – 2:23
"Sun Sweet" (Dixon) - 8:50
"North End of Town" (Kirkland) – 3:17
Side Two
"We Live To Play" (Dixon) - :26
"Slaughtered Elves" (Kirkland) - 2:29
"Can't I Buy A Song" (Dixon) - 2:39
"Sunday Feeling" (Kirkland) - 4:14
"People Aren't Free" (Dixon) - 4:09
"Cost Of Money" (Stout) - 4:18
"My Final Song" (Dixon) - 6:24

Personnel 
Don Dixon – bass, vocals
Robert Kirkland – guitars, vocals
Marty Stout – keyboards
Steve Herbert – drums, vocals
Brian Cumming – French horn on "Sun Sweet"
Bob Ennis - violin on "North End of Town"
Technical
Wayne Jernigan - recording
Randy Crittenden - art direction
Susan Dixon, John Locher, Richard Carter - photography

References

1975 albums
Arrogance (band) albums